International Dance Day is a global celebration of dance, created by the Dance Committee of the International Theatre Institute (ITI), the main partner for the performing arts of UNESCO. The event takes place every year on 29 April, which is the anniversary of the birth of Jean-Georges Noverre (1727–1810), who is considered to be the "father" or creator of modern ballet (ie. classical or romantic ballet as we know it today not "Modern Ballet" as this is sometimes confused with contemporary ballet.) The day strives to encourage participation and education in dance through events and festivals held on the date all over the world. UNESCO formally recognize ITI to be the creators and organizers of the event.

About 
Every year, since its creation in 1982, an outstanding dance personality is selected to write a message for International Dance Day. ITI also create a flagship event in a selected host city, at which there are dance performances, educational workshops, humanitarian projects and speeches made by ambassadors, dignitaries, dance personalities and the selected Message Author for that year.

The day is a celebration day for those who can see the value and importance of the art form dance, and acts as a wake-up-call for governments, politicians and institutions which have not yet recognised its value to the people.

Event 
To mark International Dance Day each year, on 29 April, the International Theatre Institute invites its members along with dancers, choreographers, dance students and enthusiasts to join them in a Gala Celebration.

The Gala Celebration takes place in a chosen host city decided on by the Executive Council of the International Theatre Institute – for instance in 2017 it was held in Shanghai, China, and in 2018 it was in Havana, Cuba.

The programme of the Gala Event can vary, but usually consists of top-quality dance performances from around the world, student performances, keynote speeches, and a recital of the Message for that year’s event read, in person, by that years selected message author.

In Shanghai 2017 for instance, the event became a three-day celebration with greater emphasis on education through dance workshops and presentations led by an international cast of dance experts. The evenings were reserved for performances, the finale of which was the Gala Celebration. The Shanghai event also had a humanitarian aspect, with much of its focus being on celebrating the achievements of disabled dancers and encouraging disabled children to dance.

Beyond the Gala itself, ITI Centres across the globe are encouraged to mark 29 April in their own country through special educational initiatives, humanitarian drives, dance performances and festivals.

Message Authors 
To help publicise International Dance Day each year the International Theatre Institute selects an outstanding personality from the world of dance to be the Message Author for the event. In the message, it is hoped that the author can underline the relevance and power of dance. Past authors have included Trisha Brown, Alicia Alonso, and Merce Cunningham.

As 2018 marked the 70th Anniversary of ITI, 5 Message Authors were selected for the 2018 event, one from each of the 5 UNESCO Regions. The 5 authors were; Georgette Gebara (Lebanon, Arab Countries), Salia Sanou (Burkina Faso, Africa), Marianela Boan (Cuba, The Americas), Willy Tsao (China, Asia-Pacific) and Ohad Naharin (Israel, Europe).

List of past Message Authors:

References

External links

 Dance Day Official Site

April observances
Dance events
Awareness days
Dance Day, International